Kimmo Pikkarainen (born December 19, 1976 in Helsinki) is a Finnish professional ice hockey defenceman. He currently plays for the team HKM Zvolen in Slovak Extraliga.

External links

 Player Profile Jatkoaika.com

Living people
1976 births
Jokerit players
Ice hockey people from Helsinki
Finnish ice hockey defencemen
Espoo Blues players
Tappara players
JYP Jyväskylä players
Lahti Pelicans players
KalPa players
21st-century Finnish people